Pierre-André Flückiger (18 May 1919 – 1994) was a Swiss sports shooter. He competed at the 1952 Summer Olympics and 1960 Summer Olympics.

References

External links
 

1919 births
1994 deaths
Swiss male sport shooters
Olympic shooters of Switzerland
Shooters at the 1952 Summer Olympics
Shooters at the 1960 Summer Olympics
People from La Chaux-de-Fonds
Sportspeople from the canton of Neuchâtel
20th-century Swiss people